Lepidiolamprologus kendalli is a species of cichlid endemic to Lake Tanganyika preferring rocky areas.  This carnivorous species preys upon fish.  This species can reach a length of  TL.  It can also be found in the aquarium trade.

Etymology
The specific name honours the American fish ecologist Robert L. Kendall, who collected the type.

References

Fauna of Zambia
kendalli
Endemic fauna of Zambia
Taxa named by Max Poll
Taxa named by Donald J. Stewart
Fish described in 1977
Taxonomy articles created by Polbot